St Mary the Virgin Church, Cowes is a Church of England parish church in Cowes, Isle of Wight. It is in Church Road, next to Northwood House.

History
The first church on the site was built in 1657, during the Commonwealth of England. A chancel designed by Joseph Richards was added in 1811. John Nash designed the west tower, which was added in 1816. It is unusual for being in a Greek Revival style. In 1867 the whole church except for the west tower was rebuilt to Gothic Revival designs by the architect Arthur Cates.

Parish and benefice
The church is part of a single benefice with Holy Trinity Church, Cowes.

Organ
The church has a two-manual organ, originally built by Henry Willis & Sons. Its specification is on the National Pipe Organ Register.

References

Church of England church buildings on the Isle of Wight
Grade II* listed churches on the Isle of Wight
Cowes